The Fall River Branch Railroad was incorporated in Massachusetts in 1844, to provide a rail link from the emerging textile town of Fall River to the New Bedford and Taunton Railroad at Myricks Junction. It began operating in 1845 with 12 miles of track. A year later, in 1846 it merged with the Middleborough Railroad Corporation and the Randolph & Bridgewater Railroad Corporation to become the Fall River Railroad Company, with a new connection to Bridgewater. It operated as the Fall River Railroad until 1854 when it merged into the Old Colony Railroad to become the Old Colony and Fall River Railroad Company.

The Fall River Railroad, under the leadership of Richard Borden began regular steamship service to New York City. The service became known as the Fall River Line, which for many years was the preferred means of travel between Boston and New York City.

The original 1845 alignment of the Fall River Branch Railroad is currently part of the South Coast Rail project  from Fall River to Boston. The state purchased the track from CSX in 2010 for $21 million, along with sections of track in nearby New Bedford and Dartmouth.

See also
Fall River Railroad (1874)
Fall River Subdivision
Fall River Navigation Company

References

Predecessors of the New York, New Haven and Hartford Railroad
Railway companies established in 1844
Railway companies disestablished in 1845
Defunct Massachusetts railroads
Old Colony Railroad lines
American companies established in 1844